Lin Xinyu (born 21 October 1994) is a Chinese rower. She competed in the women's coxless four event at the 2020 Summer Olympics.

References

External links
 

1994 births
Living people
Chinese female rowers
Olympic rowers of China
Rowers at the 2020 Summer Olympics
Sportspeople from Wuhan
Asian Games gold medalists for China
Rowers at the 2018 Asian Games
Asian Games medalists in rowing
Medalists at the 2018 Asian Games